James Patrick Vandermeer (born February 21, 1980) is a Canadian former professional ice hockey defenceman who last played  for the Belfast Giants of the Elite Ice Hockey League (EIHL). Vandermeer previously played for the Philadelphia Flyers, Chicago Blackhawks, Calgary Flames, Phoenix Coyotes, Edmonton Oilers and the San Jose Sharks of the National Hockey League (NHL).

Playing career

Amateur
Vandermeer capped-off a four-year career (1997–2001) with the Red Deer Rebels of the Western Hockey League (WHL) winning the Memorial Cup in 2001, while leading the WHL that season in plus/minus, with a +49.  The recipient of the WHL Humanitarian of the Year award in 2001, Vandermeer served as the team's captain from 1999–2001, and amassed over 700 PIM in his four years in Red Deer.

Professional
On December 21, 2000, Vandermeer signed with the Philadelphia Flyers as an undrafted free agent.  He made his professional AHL debut with the Philadelphia Phantoms during the 2001-02 season. On January 2, 2003, Vandermeer made his NHL debut with the Philadelphia Flyers playing against the Anaheim Ducks.

On February 19, 2004, Vandermeer was traded to the Chicago Blackhawks with Colin Fraser and a 2004 second round draft pick in exchange for Alexei Zhamnov. During the 2004–05 NHL lockout, Vandermeer played with the Norfolk Admirals, the AHL affiliate to the Chicago Blackhawks. Vandermeer re-signed with the Chicago Blackhawks from 2005-08.  He was named one of the team's alternate captains for select games and earned over $3 million during this time.

On December 18, 2007, Vandermeer was traded back to the Philadelphia Flyers in exchange for Ben Eager. On February 20, 2008, Vandermeer was traded by the Flyers to the Calgary Flames for a third round pick in the 2009 NHL Entry Draft.

On July 1, 2008, Vandermeer signed a three-year deal worth $6.9 million as an unrestricted free agent with the Calgary Flames. On June 27, 2009, Vandermeer was traded by the Flames to the Phoenix Coyotes in exchange for Brandon Prust.

On April 7, 2010, Vandermeer was named Man of the Year by the Phoenix Coyotes. On June 30, 2010, Vandermeer was traded by the Coyotes to the Edmonton Oilers in exchange for Patrick O'Sullivan.

During the 2010–11 season with the Oilers, Vandermeer was named one of the alternate captains for select games. On March 22, 2011, Vandermeer recorded his 100th career point vs the Nashville Predators with an assist on a goal by Jordan Eberle.

On July 1, 2011,  Vandermeer became an unrestricted free agent and signed a one-year, $1 million contract with the San Jose Sharks.

On January 14, 2013, after the lockout ended, Vandermeer continued his journeyman career in signing a one-year, two-way contract with the Vancouver Canucks that paid him $600,000 at the NHL level and $275,000 at the AHL level. Vandermeer spent the majority of the shortened season with the Canucks AHL affiliate, the Chicago Wolves, and was named one of the team's alternate captains for select games.

On September 6, 2013, Vandermeer signed a one-year contract in Switzerland with the Kloten Flyers of the NLA. He signed one-year contract extensions with the Kloten Flyers in November 2013, and September 2014.

On February 2, 2016, Vandermeer signed with the Belfast Giants of the Elite Ice Hockey League. Vandermeer re-signed with the Giants in August 2017 for the 2017-18 season, becoming Belfast's player/assistant coach alongside head coach Adam Keefe in the process. Vandermeer remained with Belfast until the end of the 2018–19 season.

Personal 
Born and raised in Caroline, Alberta, Vandermeer has a brother, Pete, a pro hockey player himself.

Vandermeer and his wife, Stefanie, were introduced by their mutual friend Brent Seabrook in 2007.  They were married on July 3, 2009 in Vancouver. NHL stars Brent Seabrook and James Wisniewski served as groomsmen.  They reside in Vancouver during the offseason.  They have two children, a son, born in 2013 and a daughter, born in 2014.

Career statistics

Regular season and playoffs

Awards and honours

References

External links

 

1980 births
Belfast Giants players
Calgary Flames players
Canadian ice hockey defencemen
Canadian people of Dutch descent
Chicago Blackhawks players
Chicago Wolves players
Edmonton Oilers players
Ice hockey people from Alberta
EHC Kloten players
Living people
Norfolk Admirals players
People from Clearwater County, Alberta
Philadelphia Flyers players
Philadelphia Phantoms players
Phoenix Coyotes players
Red Deer Rebels players
San Jose Sharks players
Undrafted National Hockey League players
Canadian expatriate ice hockey players in Northern Ireland
Canadian expatriate ice hockey players in Switzerland
Canadian expatriate ice hockey players in the United States